Barry Seton (known as 'Bo'), (born 5 October 1936), is an Australian racing driver. He won the Bathurst 500 (500-mile race, about 800 km) in 1965 with co-driver Midge Bosworth driving a Ford Cortina GT500. He has competed in the Bathurst 500 (and later 1000 km) 22 times, competing every year from 1963 to 1984, and completing the race in fifteen of those. In addition to his outright win in 1965, he won his class at Bathurst (co-driven on each occasion by Don Smith) in 1976, 1977 and 1980.

Seton, who suffered from Polio as a child, was particularly noted for his mastery of the Ford Capri in the mid-1970s, registering not only the class wins at Bathurst, but also winning the Sun-7 Rothmans 3-Litre Series at Amaroo Park.

For his 21st Bathurst start in 1983, his co-driver was his son, Glenn Seton making the first of so far 25 Great Race starts and who would go on to become a two time ATCC winner. The pair were leading Class B by over a lap when their Ford Capri blew its engine resulting in a DNF.

His last start, in the 1984 James Hardie 1000 was driving a Group A Ford Mustang paired with longtime co-driver Don Smith. The pair finished 20th outright and 3rd in Group A.

He later became known as an engine builder, firstly with the Peter Jackson Nissan Team building their turbocharged engines from 1986 until 1988 before Glenn formed his own team, Glenn Seton Racing in 1989. Seton joined his son and was chief engine builder of the teams Ford Sierra RS500s until the team switched to racing the V8 Ford Falcon in late 1992. Seton also built a number of customer engines mostly for privateer V8 Supercar teams. He left his son's team after 1995 in order to give himself a new challenge and was immediately snapped up by Longhurst Racing as their chief engine builder from 1996.

Bo Seton no longer competes at the top level, but still competes in some historic touring car races with his Historic Touring Car Mk.I Ford Capri as well as building both Capri and Holden Torana engines for various cars in Group 2 of the Touring Car Masters series, including the engine for so Glenn's Group 1 1973 Ford Falcon XB Hardtop.

Career results

Complete Bathurst 500/1000 results

References

1936 births
Living people
Australian racing drivers
Bathurst 1000 winners
Australian Touring Car Championship drivers
Australian Endurance Championship drivers